A tapa is an appetizer or snack in Spanish cuisine. Tapas can be combined to make a full meal, and can be cold (such as mixed olives and cheese) or hot (such as chopitos, which are battered, fried baby squid, or patatas bravas). In some bars and restaurants in Spain and across the globe, tapas have evolved into a very sophisticated cuisine.  In some Central American countries, such snacks are known as bocas. In parts of Mexico, similar dishes are called botanas.

History 

The word "tapas" is derived from the Spanish verb tapar, "to cover", a cognate of the English top.

In pre-19th-century Spain tapas were served by posadas, albergues or bodegas, offering meals and rooms for travellers. Since few innkeepers could write and few travellers read, inns offered their guests a sample of the dishes available, on a "tapa" (the word for pot cover in Spanish).

According to Joy of Cooking, the original tapas were thin slices of bread or meat which sherry drinkers in Andalusian taverns used to cover their glasses between sips. This was a practical measure meant to prevent fruit flies from hovering over the sweet sherry (see below for more explanations). The meat used to cover the sherry was normally ham or chorizo, which are both very salty and activate thirst. Because of this, bartenders and restaurant owners created a variety of snacks to serve with sherry, thus increasing their alcohol sales. The tapas eventually became as important as the sherry.

Tapas have evolved through Spanish history by incorporating new ingredients and influences. Most of the Iberian Peninsula was invaded by the Romans, who introduced more extensive cultivation of the olive following their invasion of Spain in 212 B.C. and irrigation methods. The discovery of the New World brought the introduction of tomatoes, sweet and chili peppers, maize (corn), and potatoes, which were readily accepted and easily grown in Spain's microclimates.

There are many tapas competitions throughout Spain, but there is only one National Tapas competition, which is celebrated every year in November. Since 2008, the City of Valladolid and the International School of Culinary Arts have celebrated the International Tapas Competition for Culinary Schools. Various schools from around the world come to Spain annually to compete for the best tapa concept.

Origin 

Though the primary meaning of tapa is cover or lid, in Spain it has also become a term for this style of food. The origin of this new meaning is uncertain but there are several theories:

 The tapas tradition may have begun when king Alfonso X of Castile (1221-1284) recovered from an illness by drinking wine with small dishes between meals. After regaining his health, the king ordered that taverns would not be allowed to serve wine to customers unless it was accompanied by a small snack or "tapa".
 Another popular and more modern explanation says that King Alfonso XIII (1886-1941), the last ruling monarch of Spain, stopped by a famous tavern in Cádiz (Andalusian city) where he ordered a glass of wine. The waiter covered the glass with a slice of cured ham before offering it to the king, in order to protect the wine from the blowing beach sand, as Cádiz is a windy place. The king, after drinking the wine and eating the ham, ordered another wine "con la tapa" ("with the cover").

See also 

 List of tapas
 List of hors d'oeuvre
 Aahaan kap klaem
 Antipasto
 Crostino
 Hors d'œuvre
 Meze
 Pincho
 Pu pu platter
 Smörgåsbord
 Smørrebrød
 Zakuski

References

External links 

 About.com Guide to Tapas in Spain.
 El mundo de las Tapas. History and recipes in Spanish and English
 Tapa Tells All

 
Appetizers
Serving and dining
Spanish cuisine